Masoni may refer to:

 Monte Masoni, mountain of Lombardy
 John Masoni, former NASCAR Grand National Series car owner

See also 

 Massoni, surname